Tapai (also tapay or tape) is a traditional fermented preparation of rice or other starchy foods, and is found throughout much of Southeast Asia, especially in Austronesian cultures, and parts of East Asia. It refers to both the alcoholic paste and the alcoholic beverage derived from it. It has a sweet or sour taste
and can be eaten as is, as ingredients for traditional recipes, or fermented further to make rice wine (which in some cultures is also called tapai). Tapai is traditionally made with white rice or glutinous rice, but can also be made from a variety of carbohydrate sources, including cassava and potatoes. Fermentation is performed by a variety of moulds including Aspergillus oryzae,  Rhizopus oryzae, Amylomyces rouxii or Mucor species, and yeasts including Saccharomyces cerevisiae, and Saccharomycopsis fibuliger, Endomycopsis burtonii and others, along with bacteria.

Etymology
Tapai is derived from Proto-Malayo-Polynesian *tapay ("fermented [food]"), which in turn is derived from Proto-Austronesian *tapaJ ("fermented [food]"). Derived cognates has come to refer to a wide variety of fermented food throughout Austronesia, including yeasted bread and rice wine. Proto-Malayo-Polynesian *tapay-an also refers to large earthen jars originally used for this fermentation process. Cognates in modern Austronesian languages include tapayan (Tagalog), tepayan (Iban), and tempayan (Javanese and Malay).

Starter culture 
Tapai is made by inoculating a carbohydrate source with the required microorganisms in a starter culture. This culture has different names in different regions, shown in the table below. The culture can be naturally captured from the wild, by mixing rice flour with ground spices (include garlic, pepper, chili, cinnamon), cane sugar or coconut water, slices of ginger or ginger extract, and water to make a dough. The dough is pressed into round cakes, about 3 cm across and 1 cm thick, and left to incubate on trays with banana leaves under and over them for two to three days. They are then dried and stored, ready for their next use.

Preparation

Traditional
Traditionally, cooked white rice or glutinous rice are fermented in tapayan jars. Depending on the length of time and various processes, tapai will result in a large number of end products. These include slightly fermented dough used for rice cakes (Filipino galapong); dried fermented cakes (Indonesian brem cakes); fermented cooked rice (Filipino buro, tapay, inuruban, binubudan, binuboran; Indonesian/Malaysian tapai or tape); fermented rice with shrimp (Filipino buro, balaobalao, balobalo, tag-ilo); fermented rice with fish (Filipino buro); or various rice wines (Filipino tapuy, tapey, bubod, basi, pangasi; Indonesian brem wine).

Modern

Fermented rice gruel/paste
In modern times, in addition to rice, different types of carbohydrates such as cassava or sweet potatoes can also be used. The general process is to wash and cook the target food, cool to about 30 °C, mix in some powdered starter culture, and rest in covered jars for one to two days. With cassava and sweet potato, the tubers are washed and peeled before cooking, then layered in baskets with starter culture sprinkled over each layer. The finished gruel will taste sweet with a hint of alcohol, and can be consumed as is, or left for several days more to become more sour.

Rice wine

Uses in cuisine

Indonesia
Tapai and its variants are usually consumed as it is; as a sweet mildly-alcoholic snacks, to accompany tea in the afternoon. The sweet fermented tapai however, are often used as the ingredient in a recipe of certain dishes. Sundanese cassava peuyeum is the main ingredient for colenak; a roasted fermented cassava tapai served with kinca a sweet syrup made of grated coconut and liquid palm sugar. Colenak is Sundanese portmanteau of dicocol enak which translates to "tasty dip". Tapai uli is a roasted block of bland-tasted ketan or pulut (glutinous rice) served with sweet tapai ketan or tapai pulut. The peuyeum goreng or tapai goreng, or known in Javanese as rondho royal is another example of Indonesian gorengan (assorted fritters), which is deep fried battered cassava tapai.

In beverages, tapai, both cassava or glutinous rice, might be added into sweet iced concoction desserts, such as es campur and es doger.

Philippines

In the Philippines, there are various tapay-derived dishes and drinks. They were originally referred to by the term tinapay (literally "done through tapay), as recorded by Antonio Pigafetta. But the term tinapay is now restricted to "bread" in modern Filipino languages. The most common use of fermented rice is in galapong, a traditional Filipino viscous rice dough made by soaking (and usually fermenting) uncooked glutinous rice overnight and then grinding it into a paste. It is used as a base for various kakanin rice cakes (notably puto and bibingka). Fermented gruel-type tapay are also common, with various ethnic groups having their own versions like Tagalog and Kapampangan buro, the Ifugao binuburan, and the Maranao and Maguindanao tapay. These are usually traditionally fermented with or paired with fish or shrimp (similar to Japanese narezushi), as in burong isda, balao-balao, or tinapayan.  Rice wines derived from tapay include the basi of Ilocos and the tapuy of Banaue and Mountain Province. Tapuy is itself the end product of binuburan allowed to ferment fully.

See also
Amazake
 Cơm rượu
 Jiuniang
 Rượu nếp
 Sake
Tapayan
 Tapuy

References

External links 

Dominic Anfiteatro's page on Asian cultured foods

Fermented foods
Bruneian cuisine
East Timorese cuisine
Indonesian snack foods
Malaysian snack foods
Philippine cuisine
Cassava dishes